Phyllonorycter similis is a moth of the family Gracillariidae. It is known from Japan (the islands of Hokkaidō, Honshū, Kyūshū, Satunan and Shikoku), Korea and the Russian Far East.

The larvae feed on Quercus acutissima, Quercus cerris, Quercus crispula, Quercus dentata, Quercus mongolica and Quercus serrata. They mine the leaves of their host plant. The mine has the form of an elongate-elliptical blotch mine on the lower surface of the leaf.

References

similis
Moths of Asia
Moths described in 1982